Ursala Hudson is an Alaska Native textile artist, graphic designer, and fashion designer. She also photographs and paints. She creates Chilkat weaving, including dance regalia, belts, collars, and earrings.

Biography and education
Hudson identifies as being of European, Filipina, and Alaska Native descent. She is Tlingit of the Raven moiety from her grandmother's clan, the T’akdeintaan. The clan originated from the Snail House in Hoonah, Alaska. 
 
Her mother, Clarissa Rizal was an artist and weaver. Since Hudson lived in Colorado instead of Alaska, she questioned her right to weave in Northwest styles but gradually established her weaving practice, acknowledging her state of diaspora. She began weaving a few years before 2022.

Hudson lives in Pagosa Springs, Colorado. She is a mother and serves as the president and one of the founders of Pagosa Peak Open School, the community's charter school.

Artworks
Giving Strength Robe (2019) is a collaboration with many Chilkat and Ravenstail weavers from all over North America. The concept originally came from Heidi Vantrease, the project organizers include Lily Hope, Deanna Lampe, and Ursala Hudson. The completed robe will be given to Aiding Women in Abuse and Rape Emergencies (AWARE), Juneau's gender-inclusive shelter for survivors of gender-based violence.

Exhibitions 
 2023: Sharing Honors and Burdens: Renwick Invitational 2023 (2023–24), Renwick Gallery Smithsonian Institution
 2022: Self-Determined: A Contemporary Survey of Native and Indigenous Artists, Center for Contemporary Arts Santa Fe, New Mexico
SWAIA Santa Fe Indian Market, Shiny Drop Gala Centennial Party
 2021: In the Spirit of Contemporary Native Arts (2021), Washington State History Museum, Tacoma, WA

Awards and honors 
 2022: Artist in Business Leadership Fellow from the First Peoples Fund
IAIA/SHI Artist-in-Residence in Santa Fe, January 20–February 8, 2022
 2021: LIFT Early Career Support for Native Artists, Native Arts and Cultures Foundation
 Best in show, In the Spirit of Contemporary Native Arts (2021), Washington State History Museum, Tacoma, WA
2020: Category Winner, Tidal Celebration Juried Art Show, 2020

References

Living people
American people of Filipino descent
American weavers
Native American textile artists
Native American women artists
Tlingit people
Women textile artists
21st-century Native American women
21st-century Native Americans
21st-century American women artists
Year of birth missing (living people)